The Leo Cluster (Abell 1367) is a galaxy cluster about 330 million light-years distant (z = 0.022) in the constellation Leo, with at least 70 major galaxies. The galaxy known as NGC 3842 is the brightest member of this cluster.  Along with the Coma Cluster, it is one of the two major clusters comprising the Coma Supercluster, which in turn is part of the CfA2 Great Wall, which is hundreds of millions light years long and is one of the largest known structures in the universe.

A team of scientists decided to observe the Leo Cluster with the intention of creating a catalog of extended ionized gas (EIG) clouds. This data also led to the discovery of many star-forming parents (galaxies) within the cluster. These star-forming galaxies turned out to be very similar to those found in the neighboring Coma cluster. The EIGs in the Leo cluster, however, turned out to be longer in the Leo cluster than the Coma cluster. This likely means that the Leo cluster and its stars are probably younger than most comparable clusters in the universe and evolve at a different pace.

Most dense galaxy clusters are composed mostly of elliptical galaxies. The Leo Cluster, however, mostly contains spiral galaxies, suggesting that it is much younger than other comparable clusters, such as the Coma Cluster. It is also home to one of the universe's largest known black holes, which lies in the center of NGC 3842. The black hole is 9.7 billion times more massive than the Sun.

It can be very difficult for stars to form within the Leo Cluster. This is because infalling galaxies have a tendency to strip gas away from other stars that are attempting to form. This has led to the creation of a "hot zone" where stars are unable to maintain their gas long enough to properly form.

There appears to be a number of subpopulations within the Leo Cluster. The first consists of elliptical galaxies that seem to be roughly as old as the universe. The second subpopulation contains red-sequence lenticular (lens shaped) galaxies whose ages are directly tied to their mass. The third and final subpopulation is of galaxies where star formation is still taking place, and are morphologically distributed.

See also
 Abell catalogue
 List of Abell clusters

References

External links
The Coma Supercluster with images of A1367
Leo-Galaxienhaufen (Abell 1367)
Abell 1367 - The Leo Galaxy Cluster
http://www.slate.com/blogs/bad_astronomy/2013/07/03/leo_cluster_a_buzzing_hive_of_galaxies.html
http://www.cloudynights.com/page/articles/cat/column/small-wonders/small-wonders-leo-r486

 
1367
Coma Supercluster
Great Wall filament
Abell richness class 2
Galaxy clusters
Leo (constellation)